Ticonderoga II was a passenger vessel owned by the Lake George Steamboat Company to operate on Lake George. It was refitted for passenger use from a decommissioned U.S. Navy vessel. Formerly USS LCI(L)-1085, she was an  built for the Navy during World War II. Like most ships of her class, she was not named by the Navy and known only by her designation until her refit. In the 1990s, she was replaced by the Lac Du Saint Sacrement.

References
https://www.navsource.org/archives/10/15/151085.htm
https://www.lakegeorge.com/history/steamboat-co-1950-to-2017/

1944 ships
Landing ships of the United States Navy